NK Krajišnik Velika Kladuša is a football club from Bosnia and Herzegovina based in Velika Kladuša, established in 1938.

It competes in the country's third level Second League of FBiH – West II.

Club seasons
Sources:

References

External links
 Official website

 
Association football clubs established in 1938
Velika Kladuša
1938 establishments in Bosnia and Herzegovina
Football clubs in Bosnia and Herzegovina